Dave Eggers (born March 12, 1970) is an American writer, editor, and publisher. He wrote the 2000 best-selling memoir A Heartbreaking Work of Staggering Genius. Eggers is also the founder of Timothy McSweeney's Quarterly Concern, a literary journal; a co-founder of the literacy project 826 Valencia and the human rights nonprofit Voice of Witness; and the founder of ScholarMatch, a program that matches donors with students needing funds for college tuition. His writing has appeared in several magazines.

Early life and education
Eggers was born in Boston, Massachusetts, one of four siblings. His father, John K. Eggers (1936–1991), was an attorney, while his mother, Heidi McSweeney Eggers (1940–1992), was a school teacher. His father was Protestant and his mother was Catholic. When Eggers was still a child, the family moved to the suburb of Lake Forest, near Chicago, where he attended public high school and was a classmate of actor Vince Vaughn. Eggers's elder brother, William D. Eggers, is a researcher who has worked for several conservative think tanks, doing research promoting privatization. Eggers's sister Beth died by suicide in November 2001. Eggers briefly spoke about his sister's death during a 2002 fan interview for McSweeney's.

Eggers attended the University of Illinois at Urbana–Champaign, intending to get a degree in journalism. However, his studies were interrupted by the deaths of both of his parents: his father in 1991 from brain and lung cancer, and his mother in January 1992 from stomach cancer. These events were chronicled in his first book, the fictionalized A Heartbreaking Work of Staggering Genius. At the time, Eggers was age 21, and his youngest sibling, Christopher ("Toph"), was 8 years old. The two elder siblings, William and Beth, were unable to commit to caring for Toph; his oldest sibling, William, had a full-time job and his next-oldest sibling, Beth, was enrolled in law school. As a result, Eggers took responsibility. He left the University of Illinois and moved to Berkeley, California, with his girlfriend Kirsten and his brother. They initially moved in with Eggers' sibling, Beth, and her roommate, but eventually found a place in another part of town, which they paid for with money left to them by their parents. Toph attended a small private school, and Eggers did temp work and freelance graphic design for a local newspaper.

Eventually, with his friend David Moodie, Eggers took over a local free newspaper called Cups. This gradually evolved into the satirical magazine Might.

Literary work

1990s

Eggers began writing as a Salon.com editor and founded Might magazine in San Francisco in 1994 with David Moodie and Marny Requa, while also writing a comic strip called Smarter Feller (originally Swell) for SF Weekly.

Might evolved out of the small San Francisco-based independent paper Cups, and gathered a loyal following with its irreverent humor and quirky approach to the issues and personalities of the day. An article purporting to be an obituary of former 1980s child star Adam Rich (originally intended to be Back to the Future star Crispin Glover until Glover backed out) garnered some national attention. The magazine regularly included humour pieces, and a number of essays and non-fiction pieces by seminal writers of the 1990s, including "Impediments to Passion", an essay on sex in the AIDS era by David Foster Wallace.

As Eggers later recounted in his memoir, A Heartbreaking Work of Staggering Genius, the magazine consistently struggled to make a profit, and finally ceased publication in 1997. An anthology of the best of Might magazine's brief run, Shiny Adidas Tracksuits and the Death of Camp' and Other Essays from Might Magazine, was published in late 1998. By this time, Eggers was freelancing for Esquire magazine and continuing to work for Salon.

2000s
Eggers's first book was a memoir with fictional elements, A Heartbreaking Work of Staggering Genius (2000), which focused on his struggle to raise his younger brother in the San Francisco Bay Area following the deaths of both of their parents. The book quickly became a bestseller and was a finalist for the Pulitzer Prize for General Non-Fiction. The memoir was praised for its originality, idiosyncratic self-referencing, and for several innovative stylistic elements. Early printings of the 2001 trade-paperback edition were published with a lengthy postscript entitled, Mistakes We Knew We Were Making.

In 2002, Eggers published his first fully fictional novel, You Shall Know Our Velocity, a story about a frustrating attempt to give away money to deserving people while haphazardly traveling the globe. An expanded and revised version was released as Sacrament in 2003. A version without the new material in Sacrament was created and retitled You Shall Know Our Velocity! for a Vintage imprint distribution. He has since published a collection of short stories, How We Are Hungry, and three politically themed serials for Salon.com.

In November 2005, Eggers published Surviving Justice: America's Wrongfully Convicted and Exonerated, a book of interviews with former prisoners sentenced to death and later exonerated. The book was compiled with Lola Vollen, a specialist in the aftermath of major human rights abuses and a visiting scholar at the University of California, Berkeley's Institute of International Studies.

Eggers's 2006 novel What Is the What: The Autobiography of Valentino Achak Deng was a finalist for the 2006 National Book Critics Circle Award for Fiction. Eggers also edits the Best American Nonrequired Reading series, an annual anthology of short stories, essays, journalism, satire, and alternative comics.

Eggers was one of the original contributors to ESPN The Magazine and helped create its section "The Jump". He also acted as the first, anonymous "Answer Guy", a column that continued to run after he stopped working for the publication.

On November 7, 2009, he was presented with the "Courage in Media" Award by the Council on American-Islamic Relations for his book Zeitoun. Zeitoun was optioned by Jonathan Demme, who considered an animated film-rendition of the work. To Demme, it "felt like the first in-depth immersion I'd ever had through literature or film into the Muslim-American family. ... The moral was that they are like people of any other faith, and I hope our film, if we can get it made, will also be like that." Demme, quoted in early 2011, expressed confidence that when the script was finished, he would be able to find financing, perhaps even from a major studio. However, in May 2014, The Playlist reported that the film was "percolat[ing] in development". Demme died in April 2017, and the project has not been heard of since.

2010s
In the early 2010s, after going six years without publishing substantive literary fiction following What is the What, Eggers began a three-year streak of back-to-back novels, each broadly concerned with pressing social and political issues facing the United States and the wider world in the twenty-first century. Eggers published his novel of the Great Recession and late 2000s financial crisis, A Hologram for the King, in July 2012. In October of that year, the novel was announced as a finalist for the National Book Award.

Eggers followed this with The Circle, released in October 2013, and depicting the life of a young worker at a fictional San Francisco-based technology company in the near future, as she faces doubts about her vocation, due to the company's seemingly well-intentioned innovations revealing a more sinister underlying agenda. Completing the productive spell, a new novel concerning anxiety with America's place in the world, Your Fathers, Where Are They? And the Prophets, Do They Live Forever?, was published in June 2014. In November 2015, Your Fathers, Where Are They ... was longlisted for the 2016 International Dublin Literary Award, Eggers' fifth nomination for the award following earlier nominations for The Circle, A Hologram for the King, The Wild Things, and What is the What.

In April 2016, Eggers visited Israel, as part of a project by the "Breaking the Silence" organization, to write an article for a book on the Israeli occupation, to mark the 50th anniversary of the Six-Day War. The book was edited by Michael Chabon and Ayelet Waldman, and was published under the title "Kingdom of Olives and Ash: Writers Confront the Occupation", in June 2017.

In July 2016, Eggers published his sixth novel, Heroes of the Frontier. Earlier the same year, a film adaptation of Eggers' earlier novel A Hologram for the King was released, to mixed reviews and middling commercial performance. The Circle, a film version of Eggers' book, starring Emma Watson, John Boyega, and Tom Hanks (who had starred in the Hologram for the King adaptation), was released in April 2017. Eggers followed Heroes of the Frontier with The Monk of Mokha (2018), another nonfiction biography in a similar vein to Zeitoun, billed by the publishers as "the exhilarating true story of a young Yemeni American man, raised in San Francisco, who dreams of resurrecting the ancient art of Yemeni coffee but finds himself trapped in Sana'a by civil war."

Eggers ended the decade by publishing two very stylistically different novellas, written concurrently with each other. The Parade, published by Knopf in March 2019, was a spare, minimalist novella reflecting Eggers' long-standing concerns with humanitarian issues, global development, and Western perceptions of the developing world. According to the advance blurb from the publisher, the novel concerns "two men, Western contractors sent to work far from home, tasked with paving a road to the capital in a dangerous and largely lawless country." Reviews were mixed: positive notices included Andrew Motion writing in The Guardian that "[Eggers'] novel may be sternly reduced in terms of its cast and language, but this leanness doesn't diminish the strength of its argument", while Ron Charles in The Washington Post demurred that The Parade "[is] a story that conforms to the West's reductive attitudes about the developing world. Writers and politicians have long generalized about those individual cultures. A novel that lumps them together into a nameless, primitive nation only plays into that tendency." The Parade was followed in November 2019 by another short novella, The Captain and the Glory, billed by Eggers himself as an "allegorical satire" of the Trump administration. In an interview with the publishers Knopf published on the McSweeney's website, Eggers described the novel as "an attempt to understand this era by painting it in the gaudy and garish colors it really deserves... This is part farce, part parable, and I do hope, though the Captain bears more than a passing resemblance to Trump, that the book will be readable when Trump is gone. That's part of the reason I called it 'An entertainment' on the title page. It's a nod to Graham Greene but also the way I hope people will read it. It was cathartic to write and I hope cathartic to read." As with The Parade, reviews were decidedly mixed, with much criticism noting that Eggers' satire struggled to keep up with or do justice to the events of the Trump era. In a review for the Financial Times, Carl Wilkinson expressed bemusement about the purpose of the book and its intentions, Hannah Barekat in The Spectator was critical for the "heavy handed" nature of the book's satire, while The Guardian, The Times Literary Supplement, and Kirkus Reviews also found the book wanting.

2020s
Eggers returned to the literary fold in 2021 with two new works of literary fiction. A short novella The Museum of Rain, is due for publication in June 2021, and according to the McSweeney's website, the "elegiac" short story concerns "an American Army vet in his 70s who is asked to lead a group of young grand-nieces and grand-nephews on a walk through the hills of California's Central Coast. Walking toward a setting sun, their destination is a place called The Museum of Rain, which may or may not still exist, and whose origin and meaning are elusive to all." Eggers' next novel, The Every, was released in October 2021. The novel is a follow-up to his 2013 novel The Circle.

McSweeney's
Eggers founded McSweeney's, an independent publishing house, named for his mother's maiden name. The publishing house produces a quarterly literary journal, Timothy McSweeney's Quarterly Concern, first published in 1998; a monthly journal, The Believer, which debuted in 2003 and is edited by Eggers's wife, Vendela Vida; and, from 2005 to 2012, a quarterly DVD magazine, Wholphin. Other works include The Future Dictionary of America, Created in Darkness by Troubled Americans, and "Dr. and Mr. Haggis-On-Whey", all children's books of literary nonsense, which Eggers writes with his younger brother Toph Eggers and uses as a pseudonym. 

Ahead of the 2006 FIFA World Cup, Eggers wrote an essay about the U.S. national team and soccer in the United States for The Thinking Fan's Guide to the World Cup, which contained essays about each competing team in the tournament and was published with aid from the journal Granta. According to The San Francisco Chronicle, Eggers was rumored to be a possible candidate to be the new editor of The Paris Review before the Review selected Lorin Stein.

Visual art work
While at the University of Illinois, Urbana-Champaign, Eggers attended art classes. After the publication of A Heartbreaking Work of Staggering Genius, he focused mainly on writing, but publicly returned to visual art with a solo gallery show at Electric Works, San Francisco, in 2010, called "It Is Right to Draw Their Fur". The show featured many drawings of animals often paired with phrases, sometimes out of the Bible. In conjunction with that exhibition, McSweeney's published a catalog featuring 25 loose-leaf prints of the work featured in the show. In 2015 Eggers had his first solo museum exhibition at the Nevada Museum of Art called "The Insufferable Throne of God". Eggers is represented by Electric Works, a fine art gallery in San Francisco.

Outside of exhibitions, Eggers' visual art contributions include the following:
 Provided album art for Austin rock group Paul Banks & the Carousels' album Yelling at the Sun.
 Designed the artwork for Thrice's album Vheissu.

826 National
In 2002, Eggers and educator Nínive Clements Calegari co-founded 826 Valencia, a nonprofit writing and tutoring center for kids ages 6–18 in San Francisco. It has since grown into six chapters across the United States: Los Angeles, New York City, Chicago, Ann Arbor, Michigan, Washington, D.C., and Boston, all under the auspices of the nonprofit organization 826 National.

In 2006, he appeared at a series of fund-raising events, dubbed the Revenge of the Book–Eaters tour, to support these programs. The Chicago show, at the Park West theatre, featured Death Cab for Cutie front man Ben Gibbard. Other performers on the tour included Sufjan Stevens, Jon Stewart, Davy Rothbart, and David Byrne. In September 2007, the Heinz Family Foundation awarded Eggers a $250,000 Heinz Award (given to recognize "extraordinary achievements by individuals") in the Arts and Humanities. In accordance with Eggers's wishes, the award money was given to 826 National and The Teacher Salary Project.

In April 2010, under the umbrella of 826 National, Eggers launched ScholarMatch, a nonprofit organization that connects donors with students to make college more affordable.

Controversy and activism
Eggers book The Every was released in 2021 but he refused to sell it on Amazon, limiting the release to independent book stores only. 

In 2022, Eggers books were one of several titles banned in South Dakota schools because they had sexual content in them. Eggers went to South Dakota to speak to authorities and students and offered any students who wanted one of the banned books copies for free via his website. 

In December 2022, Eggers travelled on behalf of PEN America to Kyiv, Ukraine. He published "The Profound Defiance of Daily Life In Kyiv" in The New Yorker based on his time in the war-torn country.

Musical contributions
 Eggers can be heard talking with Spike Jonze during "The Horrible Fanfare/Landslide/Exoskeleton", the final track on Beck's 2006 album The Information. The third section of the track features Eggers and Jonze responding to Beck's question, "What would the ultimate record that ever could possibly be made sound like?"
 Eggers contributed lyrics to the song, "The Ghost of Rita Gonzolo", on One Ring Zero's album As Smart as We Are (2004).

Personal life 
Eggers was the primary guardian of his youngest brother Toph Eggers and later co-authored children's books together. Eggers lives in the San Francisco Bay Area and is married to Vendela Vida, also a writer. The couple have two children. Vida and Eggers had met in 1998 in San Francisco at a wedding and started dating in 1999.

He was one of three 2008 TED Prize recipients. His TED Prize wish was for helping community members to personally engage with local public schools. The same year, he was named one of "50 Visionaries Who Are Changing the World" by Utne Reader.

Awards and honors

 2000 Time Best Book of the Year, A Heartbreaking Work of Staggering Genius
 2000 Washington Post Best Book of the Year, A Heartbreaking Work of Staggering Genius
 2000 San Francisco Chronicle Best Book of the Year, A Heartbreaking Work of Staggering Genius
 2000 Los Angeles Times Best Book of the Year, A Heartbreaking Work of Staggering Genius
 2000 The New York Times Book Review Editors' Choice, A Heartbreaking Work of Staggering Genius
 2001 Pulitzer Prize for General Non-Fiction finalist, A Heartbreaking Work of Staggering Genius
 2001 Addison Metcalfe Award (American Academy of Arts and Letters)
 2003 Independent Book Award, You Shall Know Our Velocity
 2005 Named one of Time magazine's 100 Most Influential People
 2005 Honorary Doctor of Letters from Brown University. He delivered the baccalaureate address at the school in 2008.
 2006 Salon Book Award for What is the What
 2007 The 13th Annual Heinz Award (Arts and Humanities)
 2007 National Book Critics Circle Award (Fiction) finalist, What is the What
 2008 TED Prize
 2008 International Dublin Literary Award longlist, What is the What
 2009 Literarian Award of the National Book Award
 2009 Prix Médicis award, What is the What
 2009 Los Angeles Times Book Prize (Current Interest), Zeitoun
 2009 Los Angeles Times Book Prize (Innovator's Award)
 2009 Entertainment Weekly "End-of-the-Decade" Best of list, Zeitoun
 2010 American Book Award, Zeitoun
 2010 Northern California Book Award (Creative Nonfiction) nomination, Zeitoun
 2010 Dayton Literary Peace Prize, Zeitoun
 2011 International Dublin Literary Award longlist, The Wild Things
 2012 National Book Award (Fiction) finalist, A Hologram for the King
 2012 A Hologram for the King named in the 10 Best Books of 2012 list by editors of The New York Times Book Review
 2012 A Hologram for the King included in Publishers Weekly Best Books of 2012 list
 2012 Commonwealth Club Inforum's 21st Century Award
 2012 Hollywood.com Best Books of 2012 list, A Hologram for the King
 2012 Albatros Literaturpreis for Zeitoun, co-won with German translators Ulrike Wasel and Klaus Timmermann.
 2012 The New York Times 100 Notable Books of 2012 List (Fiction & Poetry), A Hologram for the King
 2012 The New York Times 10 Best Books of 2012 list (Fiction, chosen by the editors of The New York Times Book Review), A Hologram for the King
 2012 PEN Center USA Award of Honor 2012
 2013 Eggers was the 2013 recipient of Smithsonian magazine's American Ingenuity Award in the Social Progress category
 2013 California Book Award (Fiction) finalist, A Hologram for the King
 2014 International Dublin Literary Award longlist, A Hologram for the King
 2015 International Dublin Literary Award longlist, The Circle
 2015 Inducted into the American Academy of Arts and Letters
 2018 International Dublin Literary Award shortlist, Your Fathers, Where Are They? And the Prophets, Do They Live Forever?

Bibliography

Novels 
 You Shall Know Our Velocity, or You Shall Know Our Velocity! (2002)
 Sacrament (2003), revised and expanded version of You Shall Know Our Velocity
 The Unforbidden is Compulsory; or, Optimism (2004), novella
 What Is the What: The Autobiography of Valentino Achak Deng (2006)
 The Wild Things (2009), novelization of the film Where the Wild Things Are
 A Hologram for the King (2012)
 The Circle (2013)
 Your Fathers, Where Are They? And the Prophets, Do They Live Forever? (2014)
 Heroes of the Frontier (2016)
 The Parade (2019)
 The Captain and the Glory (2019)
 The Museum of Rain (2021), novella
 The Every (2021)

Short stories 

Collections:
 Jokes Told in Heaven About Babies (2003), as Lucy Thomas, collection
 How We Are Hungry (2004), collection of 15 short stories:
 "Another", "What It Means When a Crowd in a Faraway Nation Takes a Soldier Representing Your Own Nation, Shoots Him, Drags Him from His Vehicle and Then Mutilates Him in the Dust", "The Only Meaning of the Oil-Wet Water", "On Wanting to Have Three Walls up Before She Gets Home", "Climbing to the Window, Pretending to Dance", "She Waits, Seething, Blooming", "Quiet", "Your Mother and I", "Naveed", "Notes for a Story of a Man Who Will Not Die Alone", "About the Man Who Began Flying After Meeting Her", "Up the Mountain Coming Down Slowly", "There Are Some Things He Should Keep to Himself", "When They Learned to Yelp", "After I Was Thrown in the River and Before I Drowned"
 Short Short Stories (2005), part of the Pocket Penguins series, collection of 24 short stories:
 "You Know How to Spell Elijah", "This Certain Song", "What the Water Feels Like to the Fishes", "The Weird Wife", "This Flight Attendant (Gary, Is It?) Is On Fire!", "True Story - 1986 - Midwest - USA - Tuesday", "It is Finally Time to Tell the Story", "A Circle Like Some Circles", "On Making Someone a Good Man By Calling Him a Good Man", "The Definition of Reg", "How Long It Took", "She Needed More Nuance", "The Heat and Eduardo, Part I", "Of Gretchen and de Gaulle", "The Heat and Eduardo, Part II", "Sleep to Dreamier Sleep Be Wed", "On Seeing Bob Balaban in Person Twice in One Week", "When He Started Saying 'I Appreciate It' After 'Thank You'", "You'll Have to Save That For Another Time", "Woman, Foghorn", "How Do Koreans Feel About the Germans?", "Georgia is Lost", "They Decide To Have No More Death", "Roderick Hopes"
 How the Water Feels to the Fishes (2007), part of One Hundred and Forty-Five Stories in a Small Box, collection of 31 short stories:
 "Once a year", "Accident", "Old enough", "She needs a new journal", "Sooner", "The commercials of Norway", "Lily", "The boy they didn't take pictures of", "The fights not fought", "The horror", "How the water feels to the fishes", "How to do it", "Go-getters", "Deeper", "The battle between", "There are different kinds", "Alberto", "You still know that boy", "No safe harbor", "The bounty", "On making him a good man calling him a good man", "Thoughtful that way", "We can work it out", "No one knows", "The island from the window", "The anger of the horses", "California moved west", "How the air feels to the birds", "The man who", "Older than", "Steve again"

Uncollected short stories:
 "The Man At The River" (2013)
 "We Like You So Much and Want to Know You Better" (2013)
 "The Alaska of Giants and Gods" (2014)
 "Understanding the Sky" (2015)

Children's books 

The Haggis-on-Whey World of Unbelievable Brilliance series (as "Dr. and Mr. Doris Haggis-On-Whey", with Christopher Eggers, picture books):
 Giraffes? Giraffes! (2003)
 Your Disgusting Head (2001)
 Animals of the Ocean, in Particular the Giant Squid (2006)
 Cold Fusion (2008)
 Children and the Tundra (2010)

Stand-alones:
 When Marlana Pulled a Thread (2011), picture book
 The Bridge Will Not Be Gray (2015), with illustrations by Tucker Nichols, picture book
 Her Right Foot (2017), with illustrations by Shawn Harris, picture book
 The Lifters (2018)
 What Can a Citizen Do? (2018), with illustrations by Shawn Harris, picture book
 Abner & Ian Get Right-Side Up (2019), with illustrations by Laura Park, picture book
 Most of the Better Natural Things in the World (2019), with illustrations by Angel Chang, picture book
 Tomorrow Most Likely (2019), with illustrations by Lane Smith, picture book
 Faraway Things (2021), with illustrations by Kelly Murphy, picture book

Non-fiction 

 Teachers Have It Easy: The Big Sacrifices and Small Salaries of America's Teachers (2005), with Daniel Moulthrop and Nínive Clements Calegari, sociology
 Zeitoun (2009), biography
 It Is Right to Draw Their Fur: Animal Renderings (2010), drawings
 Visitants (2013), travels
 
 
 Ungrateful Mammals (2017), drawings
 The Monk of Mokha (2018), biography
 Phoenix (2019), politics
Memoirs

Works edited and prefaced 

 Drama in the Desert: The Sights and Sounds of Burning Man (Eggers wrote the foreword) (2002)
 Surviving Justice: America's Wrongfully Convicted and Exonerated (co-compiled with Lola Vollen; with an introduction by Scott Turow) (2005)
 Stories Upon Stories (2016), anthology of short stories, editor and contributor
 Some Recollections from a Busy Life: The Forgotten Story of the Real Town of Hollister, California by T.S. Hawkins (2016) (Eggers provides the introduction to a reprint of an autobiography by his great, great grandfather originally published in 1913)

Filmography 

 Away We Go (2009), screenplay co-written with wife Vendela Vida
 Where the Wild Things Are (2009), screenplay co-written with director Spike Jonze
 Promised Land (2012), screenplay by Matt Damon and John Krasinski, story by Dave Eggers
 A Hologram for the King (2016), film directed by Tom Tykwer, based on novel A Hologram for the King
 Your Mother and I (2016), short directed by Anna Maguire, based on Eggers’ short story "Your Mother and I"
 The Circle (2017), screenplay co-written with director James Ponsoldt and based on Eggers’ novel The Circle

References

Further reading

Criticism and interpretation
 Altes, Liesbeth Korthals (2008) "Sincerity, Reliability, and Other Ironies — Notes on Dave Eggers' A Heartbreaking Work of Staggering Genius" in Narrative Unreliability in the Twentieth-Century First-Person Novel (eds. Elke D'hoker and Gunther Martens). Berlin: Walter de Gruyter.
 Boxall, Peter. Twenty-First-Century Fiction: A Critical Introduction. Cambridge University Press, 2013. [contains discussion of What is the What]
 D'Amore, Jonathan. American Authorship and Autobiographical Narrative: Mailer, Wideman, Eggers. Palgrave Macmillan, 2012. [joint study on works of Norman Mailer, John Edgar Wideman, and Eggers; contains discussion of ... Staggering Genius, "Mistakes We Knew We Were Making", You Shall Know Our Velocity, and What is the What]
 den Dulk, Allard. Existentialist Engagement in Wallace, Eggers and Foer. Bloomsbury, 2014. [joint study on the works of Eggers, David Foster Wallace, and Jonathan Safran Foer; contains discussion of ... Staggering Genius, You Shall Know Our Velocity and The Circle]
 Funk, Wolfgang. The Literature of Reconstruction: American Literature in the New Millennium. Bloomsbury. 2015 [contains a chapter on 'reconstructing the author' in A Heartbreaking Work of Staggering Genius]
 Galow, Timothy W. Understanding Dave Eggers. University of South Carolina Press. 2014.
 Giles, Paul. The Global Remapping of American Literature. Princeton University Press, 2011 [contains discussion of  ... Staggering Genius and What is the What]
 Grassian, Daniel. Hybrid Fictions: American Literature and Generation X. McFarland, 2003 [contains discussion of A Heartbreaking Work of Staggering Genius]
 Hamilton, Caroline D. "Blank Looks: Reality TV and Memoir in A Heartbreaking Work of Staggering Genius. Australasian Journal of American Studies, vol.28, no.2. (December 2009), pp.31-46
 Hamilton, Caroline D. One Man Zeitgeist: Dave Eggers, Publishing and Publicity. Bloomsbury, 2012.
 Holland, Mark K. Succeeding Postmodernism: Language and Humanism in Contemporary American Literature. Bloomsbury, 2013. [contains discussion of ... Staggering Genius]
 Jensen, Mikkel (2014) "A Note on a Title: A Heartbreaking Work of Staggering Genius" in The Explicator. Volume 72, Issue 2.
 Mosseau, Robert. "Connecting Travel Writing, Bildungsroman, and Therapeutic Culture in Dave Eggers's Literature" in Lanzendorfer, Tim [ed.] The Poetics of Genre in the Contemporary Novel. Lexington Books, 2015. [contains discussion of You Shall Know Our Velocity and A Hologram for the King]
 Nicol, Bran (2006) "'The Memoir as Self-Destruction': Dave Eggers's A Heartbreaking Work of Staggering Genius" in Modern Confessional Writing (ed. Jo Gill). New York: Routledge.
 Peek, Michelle. "Humanitarian Narrative and Posthumanist Critique: Dave Eggers's What is the What. Biography. 35.1 (Winter, 2012), pp.115-136.
 Pignagnoli, Virginia. "Sincerity, Sharing, and Authorial Discourses on the Fiction/Nonfiction Distinction: The Case of Dave Eggers's You Shall Know Our Velocity" in Lanzendorfer, Tim [ed.] The Poetics of Genre in the Contemporary Novel. Lexington Books, 2015. [contains discussion of You Shall Know Our Velocity and The Circle]
Sommerfeld, Stephanie. "Nature Revisited: Postironic Sublimity in Dave Eggers" in Pierce, Gillian B. [ed.] The Sublime Today: Contemporary Readings in the Aesthetic. Newcastle upon Tyne: Cambridge Scholars Publishing, 2012. 67-101. 
 Timmer, Nicoline. Do You Feel it Too? The Post-Postmodern Syndrome in American Fiction at the Turn of the Millennium. Rodopi, 2010. [contains discussion of ... Staggering Genius]
 Varvogli, Aliki. Travel and Dislocation in Contemporary American Fiction. Routledge, 2012. [Contains discussion of What is the What and You Shall Know Our Velocity]

External links

 
 
 Dave Eggers in The Encyclopedia of Science Fiction
 Author page on the McSweeney's website (features a detailed bibliography)
 826 National
 

1970 births
Living people
21st-century American male writers
21st-century American novelists
21st-century American short story writers
American Book Award winners
American book editors
American book publishing company founders
American humorists
American magazine editors
American magazine publishers (people)
American male non-fiction writers
American male novelists
American male short story writers
21st-century American memoirists
American online publication editors
Businesspeople from Berkeley, California
Journalists from Illinois
McSweeney's
The New Yorker people
Novelists from Illinois
People from Lake County, Illinois
Postmodern writers
Prix Médicis étranger winners
University of Illinois Urbana-Champaign alumni
Writers from Berkeley, California
Members of the American Academy of Arts and Letters